Lehota pod Vtáčnikom is a village and municipality in Prievidza District in the Trenčín Region of western Slovakia.

History
In historical records the village was first mentioned in 1362. In Lehota pod Vtáčnikom the Football club OFK Baník Lehota pod Vtáčnikom.

Geography
The municipality lies at an altitude of 397 metres and covers an area of 27.972 km². It has a population of about 3795 people.

References

External links
 
 
https://web.archive.org/web/20080111223415/http://www.statistics.sk/mosmis/eng/run.html

Villages and municipalities in Prievidza District